Pseudatemelia pallidella is a moth of the family Oecophoridae. It was described by Jäckh in 1972. It is found in Italy.

References

Moths described in 1972
Amphisbatinae
Endemic fauna of Italy
Moths of Europe